Latvijas Krājbanka is a Latvian bank listed on the Riga OMX exchange. The bank dates back to 1924 when it was founded as the Latvian Postal Savings Bank. Operations of the savings bank continued in various forms during the Soviet period, and following the regained Latvian independence the privatisation process of the bank was initiated 1997 and concluded 2003.

The main shareholders are Lithuanian based Snoras banking group and the Russian businessman Vladimir Antonov. In 2009, Latvijas Krājbanka had a turnover revenue of 34.6 million Latvian lats with a loss of 1.9 million lats. The bank had 941 employees and 155 customer service centres in Latvia.

In November 2011, the bank was taken over by the Latvian government and will be liquidated due to bankruptcy of Snoras. Antonov was accused of fraud and misappropriation of US$290 million.

References 

Banks of Latvia
Companies based in Riga
Banks established in 1924
Banks disestablished in 2011
1924 establishments in Latvia
2011 disestablishments in Latvia
Companies nationalised by the Soviet Union
Postal savings system